Anthony Li Hui is a Chinese prelate of the Roman Catholic Church serving as Coadjutor Bishop of the Roman Catholic Diocese of Pingliang, China.

Early life 
Anthony was born in  Mei County, Shaanxi province, China in year 1972.

Priesthood 
Li was ordained a priest on 24 November 1996.

Episcopate 
On 24 July 2020, Anthony was selected as the Coadjutor Bishop of the Roman Catholic Diocese of Pingliang and confirmed on 11 January 2021. He was consecrated as a bishop on 28 July 2021 by Joseph Ma Yinglin.

References 

1972 births
Living people
Chinese bishops

21st-century Roman Catholic bishops in China